This is a list of flags of Indonesia containing images and information about the official Indonesian flags used, and other historical flags.

National flag

Governmental flags

Presidential

Ministries

Government agencies

Military and law enforcement flags

Institution flags

Rank flags

Provincial flags

Regency and city flags

Historical flags

Former Governmental flags

Flags of states and autonomous areas of the United States of Indonesia

Former province

Pre-Colonial states and kingdoms

Borneo

Java

Sulawesi

Sumatra

Lesser Sunda Islands

Maluku Islands

New Guinea

Chola Flag

Ottoman Flags in Aceh

Qing Flags in Lanfang

Colonial flags

World War 2 flags

Indonesian National Revolution

Flags of separatist movements and terror groups 

Some separatists use the flags of pre-colonial states.

Islamic State of Indonesia

Flags of political parties

former

Islamic organizations

See also 

 Armorial of Indonesia
 Flag of Indonesia

References

Notes

Indonesia
Flags of Indonesia
Flags